Castleton station or Castleton railway station may refer to:

Castleton station (Vermont), an Amtrak station in Castleton, Vermont, U.S.A.
Castleton railway station, a railway station in Castleton, Greater Manchester, England
Castleton Moor railway station, a railway station in Castleton, North Yorkshire, England

See also
Castleton (disambiguation)